Sathya Sai College For Women is a girls college in Jaipur city in Rajasthan state in India. It is situated in Jawahar Nagar locality of Jaipur. The college offers undergraduate courses. It was established in 1974. The college is affiliated with the University of Rajasthan.

References
India today
saicollege

Educational institutions established in 1974
Women's universities and colleges in Jaipur